Temple Beth El Cemetery is located at Sterling Road and Mable Street, north of the center of Helena, Arkansas. It is basically rectangular in shape, covering  on the west side of Sterling Road. It is ringed by iron fencing, with the main access entrance on Sterling Road. A paved road network divides the cemetery into three sections of roughly equal size. There are more than 300 marked graves, the earliest dating to 1862; it was moved from Helena's first Jewish cemetery after this one opened in 1875. The first cemetery was an informal site near Magnolia Cemetery, all of whose graves were moved here.

The cemetery was listed on the National Register of Historic Places in 2019.

See also
 National Register of Historic Places listings in Phillips County, Arkansas

References

1875 establishments in Arkansas
Buildings and structures completed in 1875
Buildings and structures in Phillips County, Arkansas
Cemeteries on the National Register of Historic Places in Arkansas
Historic districts on the National Register of Historic Places in Arkansas
National Register of Historic Places in Phillips County, Arkansas
Cemeteries established in the 1870s